Eighty Eight is the title of The 77s' fifth album, released in 1991. The album was recorded live at the Warehouse in Sacramento, California on March 12, 1988.

Track listing

Eighty Eight
 "Perfect Blues" – 6:00 
 "I Can't Get Over It" – 6:10 
 "Wild Blue" – 5:45 
 "Mary and the Baby Elvis" – 4:25 
 "Closer" – 5:23
 "Where It's At" – 4:53
 "The Lust, The Flesh, The Eyes & The Pride of Life" – 3:57 
 "Over Under Sideways Down" (Yardbirds cover) – 2:56 
 "Mercy Mercy" – 11:15
 "You Don't Scare Me" – 12:20 
 "I Could Laugh" – 12:30

The CD was reissued in 2000, by Fools of the World, adding a second disc of additional live tracks entitled "When Numbers Get Serious."

When Numbers Get Serious
 The Days To Come
 Paint It Black (Rolling Stones cover)
 This Is The Way Love Is
 Alone Together
 Flowers in the Sand
 Snowblind
 Outskirts
 Woody
 Nobody's Fault But Mine
 Pick Up The Pieces
 Honestly
 Dave's Blues
 God Sends Quails
 Pearls Before Swine
 Bridge of Sighs
 Saved

Personnel 
 Mike Roe – guitar, lead vocal
 Mark Tootle – keyboard, guitar, vocal
 Jan Eric – bass, background vocal
 Aaron Smith – drum

Guest musicians
David Leonhardt plays the piano on "Perfect Blues." 
Roger Smith plays the Hammond B-3 organ on "Wild Blue."
Mark Harmon plays bass guitar on "I Could Laugh."

Production notes
Recorded by Daryl Zachman. 
Mixed by Steve Griffith.

The 77s albums
1991 live albums